Horse breeding in France is a known practice since Celtic times. Linked to political prestige, military effectiveness and the need to obtain animals from daily work, he passes from the hands of wealthy lords and monasteries in the Middle Ages to those of French kings, through the National Stud created by Louis XIV and Colbert to control the private breeding. Its history is closely related to human activities and needs of each era with the emergence or disappearance of specific types of horses (horses for war, work, carriage, draft, racing, sport...) according to the uses and needs. The cavalry and transport for people or materials, in particular, are the two main motivations for this. If the reputation of the French working horses, and especially the Percheron, is known all around the world, the military riding horse is poor. The organization of the breeding and the creation of studbooks only dates from the late nineteenth century.

The engine and the progress of agriculture are largely backward farming in the twentieth century. Inducing techniques with the end of military and commercial uses of the horse, breeders are now found four main outlets. Especially for horse racing Thoroughbred farms and French trotters, the latter being most common. Some personalities like Jean-Pierre Dubois are renowned breeders. The sport has revealed some equine athletes Selle Français and Anglo-Arab, as Jappeloup. Recreational riding, or the company, still growing although the number of horses adapted remains reduced, with some local initiatives such as the successful Henson. Finally, meat production breeds (draft horses) almost exclusively deals with the exportation or horses reform. 900,000 horses are recorded in France in 2008. The National Stud disengage gradually tutelage of their long history of private farming, the many reforms in the sector were finally conducted, since 2010, the creation of the Institut français du cheval et de l'équitation.

Horse breeding is entirely within the agricultural sector since 2005, it is subject to rules regarding the identification, sale, selection of breeding techniques and monitoring of births. The French government still distributes bonuses for the birth of foals and endangered breeds of livestock competitions or recovery sports for young horses. Ranchers gather themselves into associations, unions and federations to defend and promote their business.

Agriculture in France